Angel Enforcers is a 1989 Hong Kong action film directed by Godfrey Ho and starring Pan Pan Yeung and Pauline Wong, in which female agents battle a gang of diamond thieves.

External links

References

1989 films
Hong Kong crime action films
1980s Cantonese-language films
1989 martial arts films
Girls with guns films
1980s Hong Kong films
Hong Kong martial arts films